Irsotter Noshahr is a former Iranian football club based in Noshahr, Iran.

Football clubs in Iran